Deck Mate is a shuffling machine designed by SHFL entertainment in 2002 used by casino poker rooms to assist dealers in shuffling. The original machine can shuffle a deck in approximately 45 seconds. SHFL entertainment holds a virtual monopoly over shuffling machines and generally rents them out to casinos for about $US500 a month. The machine can be purchased for around $US16,000.

In 2013, SHFL entertainment was acquired by Bally Technologies.

Deck Mate 2

In 2012, SHFL entertainment released Deck Mate 2 which can shuffle a deck in 22 seconds and includes card recognition, allows operators to call the "clock", and has a remote touchscreen display.

References

Gaming devices
Card shuffling